Lamurde is a town and Local Government Area of Adamawa State, Nigeria inhabited predominantly by the Bwatiye (Bachama)  people.

.

References

Local Government Areas in Adamawa State